Mirabad may refer to:

Afghanistan
Mirabad, Afghanistan, a town in Helmand Province

Iran

Hormozgan Province
Mirabad, Hormozgan, a village in Minab County

Isfahan Province
Mirabad, Buin va Miandasht, a village in Buin va Miandasht County
Mirabad, Mobarakeh, a village in Mobarakeh County
Mirabad, Shahreza, a village in Shahreza County
Mirabad, alternate name of Maran, Isfahan, a village in Shahreza County
Mirabad, Tiran and Karvan, a village in Tiran and Karvan County

Kerman Province
Mirabad, alternate name of Amirabad-e Nazarian, a village in Anbarabad County
Mirabad-e Abadi, a village in Anbarabad County
Mirabad-e Ansari, a village in Fahraj County
Mirabad-e Emam Qoli, a village in Fahraj County
Mirabad, Narmashir, a village in Narmashir County
Mirabad-e Chah-e Malek, a village in Rigan County
Mirabad-e Rigan, a village in Rigan County

Kermanshah Province
Mirabad, Kermanshah, a village in Salas-e Babajani County

Kurdistan Province
Mirabad-e Olya, a village in Baneh County
Mirabad-e Sofla, a village in Baneh County
Mirabad, Dehgolan, a village in Dehgolan County
Mirabad, Marivan, a village in Marivan County
Mirabad, Saqqez, a village in Saqqez County

Lorestan Province
Mirabad, Dorud, a village in Dorud County
Mirabad, Khorramabad, a village in Khorramabad County
Mirabad, Selseleh, a village in Selseleh County

Markazi Province
Mirabad, Markazi, a village in Arak County, Markazi Province

Qom Province
Mirabad, Qom, a village in Qom Province

Razavi Khorasan Province
Mirabad, Khalilabad, a village in Khalilabad County
Mirabad (36°13′ N 58°40′ E), Mazul, a village in Nishapur County
Mirabad (36°18′ N 58°49′ E), Mazul, a village in Nishapur County
Mirabad, Rivand, a village in Nishapur County
Mirabad, Zaveh, a village in Zaveh County

Sistan and Baluchestan Province
Mirabad, Bampur, a village in Bampur County
Mirabad, Chabahar, a village in Chabahar County
Mirabad, Irandegan, a village in Khash County
Mirabad, Qasr-e Qand, a village in Qasr-e Qand County

South Khorasan Province
Mirabad, Boshruyeh, a village in Boshruyeh County
Mirabad, Darmian, a village in Darmian County
Mirabad, Nehbandan, a village in Nehbandan County
Mirabad, Zirkuh, a village in Zirkuh County

West Azerbaijan Province
Mirabad, West Azerbaijan, a city in Sardasht County
Mirabad, Chaldoran, a village in Chaldoran County
Mirabad, Naqadeh, a village in Naqadeh County
Mirabad, Oshnavieh, a village in Oshnavieh County
Mirabad, Salmas, a village in Salmas County
Mirabad, Urmia, a village in Urmia County
Mirabad, Dasht, a village in Urmia County
Mirabad, Margavar, a village in Urmia County
Mirabad, Sumay-ye Beradust, a village in Urmia County

Yazd Province

Pakistan
Mirabad, Pakistan, a town in Tando Allahyar District of Sindh

See also
Mehrabad (disambiguation)
Mirobod, a city district of Tashkent, Uzbekistan
Amirabad (disambiguation)